Sphaerodactylus siboney is a small species of gecko endemic to Cuba.

References

Sphaerodactylus
Endemic fauna of Cuba
Reptiles of Cuba
Reptiles described in 2004